Carlo Guarguaglini (2 January 1933 – 7 May 2010) was an Italian racing cyclist. He rode in the 1962 Tour de France.

References

External links
 

1933 births
2010 deaths
Italian male cyclists
Place of birth missing
Sportspeople from the Province of Livorno
Cyclists from Tuscany